Kasisomayajula Viswanath, nicknamed “Vish,” is an American scientist, currently the Lee Kum Kee Professor of Health Communication at Harvard T.H. Chan School of Public Health. Viswanath received his PhD from the University of Minnesota in 1990.

References

Year of birth missing (living people)
Living people
Harvard School of Public Health faculty
University of Minnesota alumni
American scientists